The San Francisco Foghorn  is the official student newspaper of the University of San Francisco.

The newspaper was founded in 1903 as The Saint Ignatius. It changed its name to the San Francisco Foghorn in August 1928, and is one of the oldest collegiate newspapers on the West Coast. The Foghorn has continuously run weekly issues every semester. It has a readership of 5,000 and is distributed free on campus. In 2004 it was ranked 14th in collegiate newspapers in the nation by The Princeton Review. The Foghorn Online Edition was started in 1995.

Among the notable USF alumni who wrote for the Foghorn were Pierre Salinger, former press secretary for President John F. Kennedy; Warren Hinckle, publisher of Ramparts Magazine; cartoonist Dan O'Neill; president of Bleacher Report Rory Brown; Kevin Starr, author, professor, and California state librarian emeritus.

See also 
List of student newspapers

References

External links 
 
 Digital collections (1926–2019) at University of San Francisco's Gleeson Library

Newspapers published in the San Francisco Bay Area
University of San Francisco
Student newspapers published in California
Weekly newspapers published in California